Environmental Research Letters is a quarterly, peer-reviewed, open-access, scientific journal covering research on all aspects of environmental science. It is published by IOP Publishing. The editor-in-chief is Daniel Kammen (University of California, Berkeley).

Abstracting and indexing
The journal is  abstracted and indexed in:
 Chemical Abstracts
 Inspec
 Scopus
 Astrophysics Data System
 CAB Abstracts
 Environmental Science and Pollution Management
 GEOBASE
 GeoRef
 International Nuclear Information System

External links

Environmental social science journals
IOP Publishing academic journals
English-language journals
Publications established in 2006
Quarterly journals
Environmental studies journals
Environmental science journals
Open access journals